When a work's copyright expires, it enters the public domain. The following is a list of works that enter the public domain in 2012. Since laws vary globally, the copyright status of some works are not uniform. Not all works in the public domain have been expired, some works are deliberately donated into the collection for the public good or have been abandoned by their owners.

Entering the public domain in Europe 
In most European nations with the exception of Belarus, copyright law extends for the life of the author or artist, plus 70 years.

Authors 
 Sherwood Anderson
 Gabriel Alomar i Villalonga
 Elizabeth von Arnim
 Raffaello Bertieri
 Simon Dubnow
 Adriano Tilgher
 Marina Ivanovna Tsvetaeva
 Hugh Walpole
 Virginia Woolf
 James Joyce
 Tariro Musindo

Film

Music 
 Frank Bridge
 Arkady Gaidar
 Amalia Guglielminetti
 Alter Kacyzne
 Gustav Gerson Kahn
 Adolf Koczirz
 Jelly Roll Morton

Other notable figures 
 Edward Bausch
 Henri Bergson
 Frederick Banting
 Robert Baden-Powell
 John Gutzon de la Mothe Borglum
 Louis Brandeis
 August Cesarec
 Louis-Joseph Chevrolet
 Robert Delaunay
 James Frazer
 Tullio Levi-Civita
 Lazar Markovich Lissitzky
 George Minne
 Gaetano Mosca
 Ignacy Jan Paderewski
 Kole Nedelkovski
 Wilhelm II
 Petar Poparsov
 Giuseppe Rensi
 Rabindranath Tagore
 Santiago Rusiñol

Brazil
António Cabreira

Entering the public domain in the United States 

In the United States, the copyright status of works extends for the life of the author or artists, plus 70 years. If the work is owned by a corporation, then the copyright extends 95 years.

Due to the passing of the Copyright Term Extension Act (Sonny Bono Copyright Term Extension Act) in 1998, no new works would enter the public domain in this jurisdiction until 2019.

In January 2012, the Supreme Court in a 6-2 decision stated that works in the public domain can have their copyright status renewed.

See also
 2007 in public domain
 2008 in public domain
 2009 in public domain
 2010 in public domain
 2011 in public domain
 2013 in public domain
 2013 in public domain
 2014 in public domain
 2015 in public domain
 2016 in public domain
 2017 in public domain
 2018 in public domain
 2019 in public domain
 2020 in public domain
 2021 in public domain
 2022 in public domain
 List of countries' copyright lengths
 Public Domain Day
 Creative Commons
 Public Domain
 1941 in literature, 1951 in literature, 1961 in literature, and 1971 in literature for writers who died in those years
 Over 300 public domain authors available in Wikisource (any language), with descriptions from Wikidata

External links 
PublicDomainDay.org
Center for the Study of the Public Domain's Public Domain Day 2012

References 

Public domain
Public domain